José Carlos Bulnes (29 August 1989, Havana) is a Cuban sprint canoeist. At the 2012 Summer Olympics, he competed in the Men's C-2 1000 metres with Serguey Torres.

References

Cuban male canoeists
Living people
Olympic canoeists of Cuba
Canoeists at the 2012 Summer Olympics
1989 births
Pan American Games medalists in canoeing
Pan American Games bronze medalists for Cuba
Canoeists at the 2015 Pan American Games
People from Havana
Medalists at the 2015 Pan American Games
21st-century Cuban people